Boothbay is a town in Lincoln County, Maine, United States. The population was 3,003 at the 2020 census. It includes the villages of Back Narrows, Dover, East Boothbay, Linekin, Oak Hill, Ocean Point, Spruce Shores, and Trevett. The Boothbay region is a center of summer tourist activity, and a significant part of its population does not live there year-round.  Five shipyards are located in the town, the largest of which is Washburn & Doughty.

History

The Abenaki people that lived in the region called it Winnegance. The first European presence in the region was an English fishing outpost called Cape Newagen in 1623. A Englishman by the name of Henry Curtis purchased the right to settle Winnegance from the Abenaki Sachem Mowhotiwormet in 1666. However, the English were driven from their settlements by the Abenaki in 1676 during King Philip's War in 1676. The colonists returned after the war ended. In 1689 during King William's War, they were driven out again. Winnegance was abandoned entirely, and remained a desolate waste for 40 years.

Colonel David Dunbar, governor of the Territory of Sagadahock, laid out a town in 1730 known as Townsend, and convinced about 40 families of Scots-Irish Presbyterians, largely from the north of Ireland, to settle here. Some were veterans of the Revolution of 1688. Named for Lord Charles Townshend, this settlement survived and was incorporated November 3, 1764. It was renamed Boothbay in 1842 after the hamlet of Boothby, which is located about a mile east of Welton le Marsh in Lincolnshire, England. Southport was set off in 1842 and incorporated as a town, followed in 1889 by Boothbay Harbor.

Geography

Situated on the Cape Newagen peninsula extending into the Gulf of Maine, Boothbay lies between the Sheepscot River and Damariscotta River. The town includes Damariscove Island.

Boothbay is crossed by State Routes 27 and 96. It borders the towns of Edgecomb to the north, and Boothbay Harbor to the south. Separated by water, it is near the towns of Westport to the west, and South Bristol to the east.

Climate

This climatic region is typified by large seasonal temperature differences, with warm to hot (and often humid) summers and cold (sometimes severely cold) winters.  According to the Köppen Climate Classification system, Boothbay has a humid continental climate, abbreviated "Dfb" on climate maps.

Demographics

2010 census

As of the census of 2010, there were 3,120 people, 1,386 households, and 963 families living in the town. The racial makeup of the town was 98.0% White, 0.4% African American, 0.3% Native American, 0.4% Asian, and 0.8% from two or more races. Hispanic or Latino of any race were 0.5% of the population.

There were 1,386 households, of which 23.0% had children under the age of 18 living with them, 58.0% were married couples living together, 7.6% had a female householder with no husband present, 3.8% had a male householder with no wife present, and 30.5% were non-families. Of all households, 23.8% were made up of individuals, and 11.9% had someone living alone who was 65 years of age or older. The average household size was 2.25 and the average family size was 2.63.

The median age in the town was 51.7 years; 17.2% of residents were under the age of 18; 4.9% were between the ages of 18 and 24; 17.9% were from 25 to 44; 35.1% were from 45 to 64; and 24.9% were 65 years of age or older. The gender makeup of the town was 49.3% male and 50.7% female.

2000 census

As of the census of 2000, there were 2,960 people, 1,261 households, and 881 families living in the town. The racial makeup of the town was 99.05% White, 0.03% African American, 0.34% Native American, 0.14% Asian, 0.10% from other races, and 0.34% from two or more races. Hispanic or Latino of any race were 0.51% of the population.

There were 1,261 households, out of which 27.2% had children under the age of 18 living with them, 59.2% were married couples living together, 6.8% had a female householder with no husband present, and 30.1% were non-families. Of all households, 23.8% were made up of individuals, and 11.5% had someone living alone who was 65 years of age or older.  The average household size was 2.35 and the average family size was 2.77.

In the town, the population was spread out, with 21.1% under the age of 18, 5.0% from 18 to 24, 25.1% from 25 to 44, 31.2% from 45 to 64, and 17.6% who were 65 years of age or older.  The median age was 44 years. For every 100 females, there were 96.3 males.  For every 100 females age 18 and over, there were 91.9 males.

The median income for a household in the town was $41,406, and the median income for a family was $45,761. Males had a median income of $30,500 versus $28,370 for females. The per capita income for the town was $22,036.  About 5.5% of families and 6.9% of the population were below the poverty line, including 8.0% of those under age 18 and 5.2% of those age 65 or over.

Sites of interest

 Coastal Maine Botanical Gardens
 Bosarge Family Education Center
 Damarsicove Island
 Damariscove Lifesaving Station
 Knight-Corey House
 Fisherman Island
 Old Gray House
 Ram Island Light
 Boothbay Railway Village

Notable people

 Brenda Bettinson, artist
 Mabel Conkling, sculptor
 Robert H. Conn, American state official
 Francis C. Florini, politician
 Richard Ford, author
 Matthew Forgues, racewalker
 Woodbury S. Grover, politician 
 Dorothy M. Healy, English professor and historian
 T. J. Southard, shipbuilder, businessman, and politician
 John Welsh, biologist

See also

References

Further reading

  History of Boothbay, Southport and Boothbay Harbor, Maine, 1623–1905, by Francis Byron Greene; published 1906

External links

 Town of Boothbay, Maine
 Boothbay Chamber of Commerce

 
1764 establishments in the Thirteen Colonies
Populated places established in 1764
Towns in Lincoln County, Maine